Colleen Hilton (born 1956) is an American registered nurse, businessperson and politician from Maine. Hilton, a Democrat, was mayor of Westbrook, Maine, from 2009 to 2016. Westbrook is one of the ten largest cities in terms of population in Maine. Hilton is also the CEO of VNA Home Health & Hospice, a South Portland, Maine based company providing home health care and hospice services in southern Maine.

Hilton was raised in Westbrook to a large family. Prior to being elected mayor, Hilton served on the Westbrook School Committee for ten years. She is the first female mayor of Westbrook.

References

1956 births
American nurses
American women nurses
Living people
Maine Democrats
Mayors of Westbrook, Maine
Businesspeople from Maine
Women mayors of places in Maine
School board members in Maine
21st-century American women